White Bird in a Blizzard is a 2014 art drama thriller film co-produced, written, directed and edited by Gregg Araki and starring Shailene Woodley, Eva Green, and Christopher Meloni. Based on the novel of the same name by Laura Kasischke, the film follows several years in the life of teenager Katrina "Kat" Connors (Woodley), beginning on the day her mother, Eve (Green), disappeared and the effect this event has on her and the people of her life, frequently alternating between the present time and flashbacks. The film premiered at the 2014 Sundance Film Festival on January 20, 2014 before being given a limited theatrical release on October 24, 2014.

Plot
In 1988, when Katrina "Kat" Connors was 17, her beautiful but mercurial mother, Eve, disappeared without a trace. The story weaves back-and-forth with flashbacks of Eve's past life and the present day.

In the flashbacks, Eve was a wild girl who gradually changed into a domesticated housewife after marrying Brock, an ordinary man who leads an uneventful life. While Kat explores her blossoming sexuality with her handsome but dim-witted neighbour and schoolmate, Phil, Eve struggles to deal with aging and quenching her youthful wildness. She tries to be sexy when Brock is away, even luring Phil's attention. After Eve disappears, Kat deals with her abandonment without much issue, occasionally releasing her own wild side, seducing the detective investigating her mother's disappearance. The film then jumps forward three years to the spring of 1991. On a break from college, Kat returns home and seems unfazed to learn that her father is in a relationship with a co-worker.

The detective Kat has been having an affair with informs her that Brock might have killed Eve after catching her cheating. Kat dismisses this theory, just like she did three years ago, but after mentioning the topic to her friends Beth and Mickey, they tell her they suggested this same theory to her and she dismissed them as well. Kat suspects Phil of having slept with Eve and confronts him the night before she is to return to college, but Phil angrily rebuffs it and tells her that her father knows where her mother is.

After having recurring dreams about her mother being stranded in the snow, Kat begins to unpack Brock's suspiciously locked freezer in their basement but is stopped when he walks in on her. She questions him about her mother's disappearance, asking if he does in fact know where she is, but he denies having any knowledge of her whereabouts. Believing her father, Kat bids him goodbye and tearfully boards her flight, returning to college. It is revealed that this was the last time Kat sees her father, as he went out to a bar shortly thereafter and drunkenly admitted to murdering Eve. He is soon arrested and later hangs himself with a sheet in his jail cell, also revealing that he moved Eve's body from the freezer to a nearby hill the night before Kat unpacked it. Upon discovering the body, it was revealed that the body had been frozen for so long that when it was buried, it melted away.

The film ends with a flashback of Eve's death; she came home from shopping the afternoon of her disappearance to find Brock and Phil in bed together. Phil dashed out of the room and Eve began laughing hysterically at Brock, incredulous. A humiliated Brock repeatedly begged her to stop, but Eve continued laughing until he grabbed her by the throat and strangled her to death.

Cast
 Shailene Woodley as Katrina "Kat" Connors
 Ava Acres as 8-year-old Kat
 Eva Green as Eve Connors
 Christopher Meloni as Brock Connors
 Shiloh Fernandez as Phil
 Gabourey Sidibe as Beth
 Thomas Jane as Detective Scieziesciez
 Angela Bassett as Dr. Thaler
 Dale Dickey as Mrs. Hillman
 Mark Indelicato as Mickey
 Sheryl Lee as May
 Jacob Artist as Oliver

Reception

Box office
The film opened in the United States in a limited release on October 24, 2014 in 4 theaters and grossed $6,302 with an average of $1,576 per theater and ranking #80 at the box office. After 7 weeks in theaters the film earned $33,821 domestically and $344,479 internationally for a total of $378,300.

Critical response
On Rotten Tomatoes, a review aggregator, the film has a score of 55% based on 92 reviews, with an average rating of 5.6/10. The critical consensus states: "Part suburban thriller, part sexual awakening drama – and fully convincing as neither – White Bird in a Blizzard rests a little too heavily on Shailene Woodley's typically superlative work." The film also has a score of 51 out of 100 on Metacritic based on 27 critics, indicating "mixed or average reviews".

Pop Insomniacs said, "We've seen versions of this story several times, but never quite mangled together like this before, which is precisely why I was so captivated, uncomfortable and surprised by this movie". Kansas City Star reporter Jocelyn Noveck said, "It all comes down to a doozy of a plot twist, and it's enjoyably shocking. But at the end you're still left shaking your head, feeling lost, wishing there was something tangible to hold on to — perhaps a bit like being trapped in a snow globe... Two stars out of four".

Stereogum ranked the film's 80s pop- and shoegaze-heavy soundtrack as the 16th best soundtrack of 2014.

References

External links
 
 
 
 
 

2014 films
Films about missing people
2014 LGBT-related films
2010s mystery films
2014 thriller drama films
American independent films
American coming-of-age films
American LGBT-related films
American mystery films
American thriller drama films
French coming-of-age films
English-language French films
French LGBT-related films
French mystery films
French thriller drama films
2010s English-language films
Films directed by Gregg Araki
Films about dysfunctional families
Films about sexuality
Films set in 1988
Films set in 1991
Films based on American novels
French nonlinear narrative films
American nonlinear narrative films
2014 independent films
Uxoricide in fiction
2014 drama films
2010s American films
2010s French films